The Streamlining Claims Processing for Federal Contractor Employees Act was signed into law by President Barack Obama in 2013. It transfers some authority from the Government Accountability Office to the United States Department of Labor in order to streamline the implementation and enforcement of federal contractor wage laws.  Previously, the United States Department of Labor was responsible for implementing the Davis–Bacon Act, "which requires that federally-contracted workers be paid the 'local prevailing wage' on government projects, and the Contract Work Hours and Safety Standards Act (CWHSSA), which mandates that federal contractors pay their employees overtime for hours worked in excess of 40 per week."  Meanwhile, the Government Accountability Office was responsible for dealing with the claims of workers who did not make the correct wage.  This law was designed to improve efficiency by transferring that responsibility to the Department of Labor.

Background
During the 112th United States Congress, identical legislation passed in the House 361-3.

The Davis-Bacon Act requires the federal government to pay the "prevailing wages" of their local area to federal contractors, a policy opposed by some Republicans.

Provisions of the bill
This summary is based largely on the summary provided by the Congressional Research Service, a public domain source.

The Streamlining Claims Processing for Federal Contractor Employees Act would transfer authority from the Government Accountability Office (GAO) to the United States Department of Labor for processing claims for wages due to laborers and mechanics hired by contractors on public works projects.

Procedural history

House
The Streamlining Claims Processing for Federal Contractor Employees Act was introduced into the House by Rep. Tim Walberg (R, MI-7) on July 19, 2013.  It was referred to the United States House Committee on Education and the Workforce.  On September 10, 2013, the House voted in Roll Call Vote 451 to pass the bill 396-10.

Senate
The Streamlining Claims Processing for Federal Contractor Employees Act was received in the United States Senate on September 11, 2013 and referred to the United States Senate Committee on Health, Education, Labor, and Pensions.  The bill passed in the Senate on November 5, 2013 by unanimous consent.

President
The Streamlining Claims Processing for Federal Contractor Employees Act was signed into law by President Barack Obama on November 21, 2013.

Debate and discussion
According to the Republican Conference of the United States House of Representatives, H.R. 2747 would "reduce bureaucracies, redundancies, and ensure timely compensation" for federal contractors.

See also
List of bills in the 113th United States Congress
Davis–Bacon Act
Prevailing wage

Notes/References

External links

Library of Congress - Thomas H.R. 2747
beta.congress.gov H.R. 2747
GovTrack.us H.R. 2747
OpenCongress.org H.R. 2747
WashingtonWatch.com H.R. 2747

Acts of the 113th United States Congress
Employee compensation in the United States
United States Department of Labor